Vlasina is a mountainous region of southeastern Serbia. It is a border area to Bulgaria, a region of the Rhodopian Serbia, with old rocks and mountains. Its most prominent landforms are eponymous Vlasina River and Vlasina Lake. It corresponds to the territories of municipalities of Crna Trava, Vlasotince and Surdulica.

The region consists of fours smaller, micro-regions: Crna Trava, Znepolje, Lužnica and Vlasotince. Near Vlasotince, remains of the ancient volcanic eruptions are quite visible.

Economy 

The largest center of the whole region is the town of Vlasotince, but in general, the area is one of the least developed in Serbia, very poor and extremely depopulating. For example, population of Crna Trava municipality decreased from around 14,000 in 1953 to mere 2,500 in 2002. Accordingly, density also plunged, from 43 per km² in 1953 to only 8 per km² in 2002.

A circular freeway connects the valleys of the Vlasina and Južna Morava rivers.

In 2005 Hellenic Bottling Co., a subsidiary of The Coca-Cola Company, bought the local water factory ("Rosa" is a trademark for this water) which is located close to the Vlasina source thus causing potests of the local environmentalists. Activists from the "Eco base South" (Eko baza Jug) were afraid of overexploitation drying out the sources of the river.

Wildlife 

In 2018 it was announced that European free-tailed bat, previously unrecorded in Serbia, was discovered living in Vlasina region. It is a 31st species of bat which inhabits the country and the one with the largest wingspan.

References

Sources 

 Jovan Đ. Marković (1990): Enciklopedijski geografski leksikon Jugoslavije; Svjetlost-Sarajevo; 
 Veliborka Staletovic,  Environmentalists Against Exploitation of Potable Water, 23 February 2005,  published at 
 Valentina Zlatković (2007-06-22) Biser juga pod zaštitom države. Politika 

Geographical regions of Serbia
Geography of Southern and Eastern Serbia
Ramsar sites in Serbia